Jake Scott Hanson (born April 29, 1997) is an American football center for the Green Bay Packers of the National Football League (NFL). He played college football at Oregon.

College career
A 4-star recruit, Hanson committed to Oregon over offers from  California, Oregon State, Utah, and Washington State, among others. Hanson started 49 games over his career, missing one start in 2018 due to a targeting penalty the week prior and two games in 2019 due to a concussion. He did not allow a sack through his first three seasons. Hanson was a two-time second-team all-Pac-12 selection. During his senior season, he allowed two sacks and four QB hits, and was an anchor of Oregon's Joe Moore Award finalist offensive line.

Professional career

Hanson was selected by the Green Bay Packers with the No. 208 overall pick in the sixth round of the 2020 NFL draft. He was signed on July 10, 2020. During training camp, Hanson had to adjust to working with a quarterback under center, as opposed to shotgun or pistol formations. He was waived on September 5, 2020, and was signed to the practice squad the next day. He was placed on the practice squad/injured list on October 13. On January 26, 2021, Hanson signed a reserves/futures contract with the Packers. He signed his tender offer from the Packers on April 18, 2022, to keep him with the team.

Hanson made his first NFL start on September 11, 2022, at guard, in a 23–7 loss to the Minnesota Vikings. On October 22, 2022, Hanson was placed on injured reserve.

References

External links
Green Bay Packers bio
Oregon Ducks bio

Living people
1997 births
Oregon Ducks football players
Green Bay Packers players
American football centers
Players of American football from California
Sportspeople from Santa Clarita, California